Marta Wenger (born 18 July 1953) is a South African politician, currently a Member of Parliament with the Democratic Alliance. She was previously the mayor of Midvaal in Gauteng, and served as the Shadow Minister of Water and Environmental Affairs from 2012 to 2014.

References

Living people
Democratic Alliance (South Africa) politicians
People from the Western Cape
Members of the National Assembly of South Africa
Mayors of places in South Africa
Women mayors of places in South Africa
1953 births
21st-century South African women politicians
21st-century South African politicians
Women members of the National Assembly of South Africa